10th Battalion may refer to:

 10th Battalion (Canadians), CEF
 10th Battalion (Australia)
 10th Battalion, Ulster Defence Regiment
 7th/10th Battalion, Ulster Defence Regiment
 2/10th Battalion (Australia)

See also
 10th Army (disambiguation)
 10th Corps (disambiguation)
 10th Brigade (disambiguation)
 10th Division (disambiguation)
 10th Regiment (disambiguation)
 10th Group (disambiguation)
 10th Squadron (disambiguation)